Les Duos de Marc is a 2007 compilation recorded by French artist Marc Lavoine. This album is a best of containing all the singer's duets recorded throughout his career, since 1985. Released on October 22, 2007, at the same of Lavoine's other best of Les Solos de Marc, the album was very successful in France, where it topped the chart for two weeks, and in Belgium (Wallonia), where it reached the top two.

Releases

Track listings
 "Qu'est-ce que t'es belle" (Aboulker, Lavoine, Mithois) (with Catherine Ringer) — 3:56
 "Une nuit sur son épaule" (Sanson) (with Véronique Sanson) — 3:33
 "Les hommes sont des femmes comme les autres" (Arnault, Lavoine, Mithois) (with Princess Erika) — 4:13
 "Adieu Camille" (Bernheim, DeMusset) (with Julie Depardieu) — 3:43
 "J'ai tout oublié (Lavoine, Lunghini) (with Cristina Marocco) — 3:46
 "Je ne veux qu'elle" (Kapler, Lavoine) (with Claire Keim) — 3:58
 "Paris" (Aboulker, Lavoine) (with Souad Massi) — 5:03
 "Chère amie (toutes mes excuses)" (Aboulker, Lavoine) (with Françoise Hardy) — 3:37
 "Dis-moi que l'amour" (Berger, Lavoine) (with Bamboo) — 2:54
 "J'espère" (Grillet, Lavoine) (with Quynh Anh) — 3:49
 "J'ai confiance en toi (Mi fido di te)" (Cherubini, Lavoine, Onori) (with Jovanotti) — 3:36
 "Un Ami" (Lavoine, Rodde) (with Florent Pagny) — 3:56
 "Désolé" (Darc, Lo) (with Jennifer Ayache) — 4:14
 "Nuits de Chine" (Benech, Dumont) (with Bamboo) — 3:36

Source : Allmusic.

Certifications

Charts

References

2007 greatest hits albums
Marc Lavoine albums
Mercury Records compilation albums